Cognitive Behaviour Therapy is a quarterly peer-reviewed medical journal covering the application of cognitive science to the psychological study of behavior therapy. It was established in 1972 as the Scandinavian Journal of Behaviour Therapy, obtaining its current name in 2002. It is published by Taylor & Francis on behalf of the Swedish Association of Behavioural Therapists, of which it is the official journal. The editor-in-chief of the European office is Per Carlbring (Stockholm University) and that of the North American office is Mark Powers (University of Texas at Austin). In 2019 the journal had an impact factor of 4.41.

References

External links

Clinical psychology journals
Cognitive science journals
Psychotherapy journals
Behavior therapy
Publications established in 1972
Quarterly journals
English-language journals
Taylor & Francis academic journals